Bhaskarabhatla Ravi Kumar is an Indian lyricist predominantly works in Telugu cinema. He worked for more than 125 films and penned lyrics for more than 390 songs. He extensively worked with director Puri Jagannadh and music director Chakri and S. S. Thaman. He is famous for songs appealing to the masses. His primary genres are mass, romantic, and melodies. He won two Santosham Film Awards in 2006 and 2008 and a SIIMA award in 2013.

Personal life 
Bhaskarabhatla was born on 5 June 1974 in Srikakulam and brought up in Rajahmundry among five siblings. In his childhood he got interested in literature from his maternal grand father Aravelli Rajagopalacharya. While in Rajahmundry he used to frequent Gouthami Library and it influenced him to venture into poetry. Since his childhood he used to get inspired from the film posters. He completed B.A in Telugu and worked as a film journalist in Eenadu, Hyderabad for 10 years. Later he left his job to pursue a career in film industry.

He married Lalitha who is a B.Sc graduate from Warangal on 13 August 1998. The couple has two daughters Amanta, Samhita.

Career 
He started his career as a lyricist in 2000 with the film Goppinti Alludu directed by E. V. V. Satyanarayana starring Nandamuri Balakrishna. He was encouraged to be a lyricist by actor Tanikella Bharani and composer Chakri. He got break with the 2001 film Itlu Sravani Subramanyam directed by Puri Jagannadh which was a musical hit. He worked with Puri Jagannadh for 15 films and worked with composer Chakri for 65 films.
Chakri and Bhaskarabhatla both started their careers together. He also worked with popular directors like E. V. V. Satyanarayana, Trivikram Srinivas, Harish Shankar etc.

His popular songs include Malli Kuyave Guvva from Itlu Sravani Subramanyam, Ippatikinka Naa Vayasu from Pokiri, Bommanu Geesthe from Bommarillu, Gallo Thelinattunde from Jalsa, Pellenduke Ravanamma from Bumper Offer "Katuka kanule" from Soorarai Pottru.

Awards 
In 2006 he won Santosham film awards for his song in Bommarillu. In 2008 he won Santosham film award for the film Neninthe. In 2013 he won SIIMA Award for Best Lyricist (Telugu) for the song ''Sir Osthara'' in Businessman.

References

External links 

Telugu-language lyricists
People from Srikakulam
1974 births
Living people